Dealz may refer to:

People
 Member of the Jackson family

Company
 Dealz - a fixed-price discount retailer in the Republic of Ireland and Spain and Denmark 
 Poundland - the parent company of Dealz
 Dealz.com - A Coupon and Deal website in the United States.